Enrick Reuperné (born 3 August 1998) is a Martiniquais professional footballer who plays as a striker for the club Aiglon du Lamentin, and the Martinique national team.

International career
Reuperné debuted with the Martinique national team in a 2–1 CONCACAF Nations League loss to Guadeloupe on 13 October 2019. He was called up to represent Martinique at the 2021 CONCACAF Gold Cup.

Personal life
Reuperné is the son of the retired Martinique international footballer Fabrice Reuperné, who is also his current manager at Aiglon du Lamentin.

References

External links
 
 

1998 births
Living people
People from Schœlcher
Martiniquais footballers
Martinique international footballers
Association football forwards
2021 CONCACAF Gold Cup players